The 2004–05 NBA season was the Pacers' 29th season in the National Basketball Association, and 38th season as a franchise. The Pacers finished third in the Central Division with a 44–38 record. This season also marked the final season for All-Star guard Reggie Miller. (See 2004–05 Indiana Pacers season#Regular season)

Offseason

NBA Draft

Summary
Before the regular season began, the Indiana Pacers were considered a favorite in the Eastern Conference to possibly reach the NBA Finals, due to a very deep, talented roster including established names such as Reggie Miller, Jermaine O'Neal, Ron Artest, Stephen Jackson, Jamaal Tinsley, etc.

Al Harrington, a combination forward who had established himself as one of the best sixth-men in the NBA in the past two years, was dealt in the offseason to the Atlanta Hawks in return for swingman Stephen Jackson, after Harrington allegedly demanded that the Pacers start him or trade him.

Roster

Regular season

The Malice at the Palace
The Pacers started off the season in an extremely strong fashion, but they took an unexpected turn at the end of a November 19 game against the defending NBA champion Detroit Pistons.

Towards the end of a blowout over the Pistons (who had eliminated the Pacers in the previous year's Eastern Conference Finals) at The Palace of Auburn Hills, the Pacers' Ron Artest committed a hard foul against Ben Wallace. Wallace retaliated by pushing Artest, and Artest ran over to the scorer's table and laid atop it in order to prevent himself from being provoked into an altercation with Wallace. Pistons fan John Green threw a cup of beer at Artest, causing Artest to charge into the stands. The situation escalated to a full-scale brawl, with fans and several Pacers taking part. Stephen Jackson followed Artest into the stands while Jermaine O'Neal struck a fan who came onto the court. Jamaal Tinsley picked up a long-handled dustpan in order to use as a weapon, although he was never forced to use it. The game was called a Pacers victory with 45.9 seconds left on the clock and the score 97–82, and the Pacers left the floor amid a shower of beer and other beverages that rained down from the stands. Artest was suspended for the rest of the season without pay for his role in the 'basketbrawl.'

Several of the involved players were suspended by NBA Commissioner David Stern, but the hardest hit were Artest (suspended for the remainder of the regular season and playoffs), Jackson (suspended for 30 games), O'Neal (25 games), Wallace (6 games) and the Pacers' Anthony Johnson (5 games) (O'Neal's suspension was later reduced to 15 games by arbitrator Roger Kaplan, a decision that was upheld by U.S. District Judge George B. Daniels). O'Neal was charged with two counts of assault and battery, while Artest, Jackson, Johnson and David Harrison were charged with one count each.

Artest's suspension was the longest in NBA history for any suspension unrelated to substance abuse issues, keeping Artest out of a record 73 regular season games and 13 playoff games.

The Aftermath

After the brawl and the consequences that followed, the Pacers fell downward in the Central Division. They went from a legitimate title contender with a record of 7–2, to a team that hovered around .500 in winning percentage, while the Detroit Pistons eventually became the Central Division champions with a 54–28 record. In addition to all the players rendered unavailable due to suspensions, the Pacers also struggled with several injuries to key players. In one game, the Pacers were forced to activate and dress an injured Jeff Foster even though the coaching staff had no intention of letting him play, just so that they could meet the NBA's requirement that each team has at least eight active players at the start of the game; if they did not activate an eighth player, they would have been forced to forfeit the game. Meanwhile, Fred Jones played 40 or more minutes in six consecutive games, simply because the Pacers did not have any shooting guards in reserve due to an injury to Reggie Miller. Despite the difficulties with the suspensions and injuries, the Pacers earned a sixth seed in the playoffs with a record of 44–38, due to strong play by many talented members of the Pacers' deep bench, including Jones, Anthony Johnson, and Austin Croshere, and a resurgence by Miller, whose career had been dwindling in recent years. Despite Miller's resurgence, he announced in February 2005 through his sister Cheryl Miller that he would be retiring from basketball at the conclusion of the 2004–05 season.

Throughout the season, the Pacers signed several different players to replace the bench players who had been promoted to starters, including Michael Curry, Marcus Haislip, and others. In a blowout win over the Milwaukee Bucks on January 4, 2005, Jermaine O'Neal scored a career high in points, with 55. During the fourth quarter, however, he asked to be removed from the game out of respect for Reggie Miller, because he did not wish to break Miller's franchise record of 57 points, which was set during the 1992–93 NBA season. An important reason for their strong finish was the re-acquisition of Dale Davis in March, who had been released by the New Orleans Hornets after being traded there by the Golden State Warriors. He played the final 25 games of the regular season and every playoff game, contributing a strong presence at center. However, Davis' signing coincided with an injury to Jermaine O'Neal that would knock him out for virtually the remainder of the regular season—indeed, O'Neal's first missed game due to his injury was Davis' first game back with the Pacers.

So despite the adversity they had gone through, the Pacers made the playoffs for the 13th time in 14 years. In the first round, Indiana defeated the Atlantic Division champion Boston Celtics in seven games, winning Game 7 in Boston by the decisive margin of 97–70.

The Pacers then advanced to the second-round against the Detroit Pistons, in a rematch of the previous year's Eastern Conference Finals. The series featured games back at The Palace of Auburn Hills, the scene of the brawl that many assumed at the time had effectively ended the Pacers' season. After losing game 1, the Pacers won the next two games to take a 2–1 lead. However, the Pacers could not repeat their victories against the Pistons and lost the next 3 games, losing the series 4–2.

The End of An Era
The Pacers' last game of the playoffs was on May 19, 2005, at home; Reggie Miller, in his final NBA game, scored 27 points and received a huge standing ovation from the crowd. Despite Miller's effort, the Pacers lost, sending Miller into retirement without an NBA Championship in his 18-year career, all with the Pacers. Next season, Miller was honored by the Pacers during halftime of a game against the Phoenix Suns on March 30, 2006, when his #31 jersey was retired and he was presented with a Bentley Continental GT.

After the 2004–05 season, the Pacers completed a major overhaul of their roster, including moving Ron Artest, Anthony Johnson, Fred Jones, Austin Croshere, James Jones, and others over the next year.

Indeed, the Indiana Pacers' 2004–05 campaign, with the retirement of Reggie Miller and the Pacers' last winning season record until 2012, marked the end of an era in Pacers basketball.

Season standings

Record vs. opponents

Game log

Playoffs

|- align="center" bgcolor="#ffcccc"
| 1
| April 23
| @ Boston
| L 82–102
| Stephen Jackson (25)
| Dale Davis (10)
| Anthony Johnson (5)
| FleetCenter18,624
| 0–1
|- align="center" bgcolor="#ccffcc"
| 2
| April 25
| @ Boston
| W 82–79
| Reggie Miller (28)
| Anthony Johnson (7)
| Anthony Johnson (7)
| FleetCenter18,624
| 1–1
|- align="center" bgcolor="#ccffcc"
| 3
| April 28
| Boston
| W 99–76
| Reggie Miller (33)
| Jermaine O'Neal (11)
| Anthony Johnson (8)
| Conseco Fieldhouse18,345
| 2–1
|- align="center" bgcolor="#ffcccc"
| 4
| April 30
| Boston
| L 79–110
| Stephen Jackson (24)
| James Jones (9)
| Anthony Johnson (7)
| Conseco Fieldhouse18,345
| 2–2
|- align="center" bgcolor="#ccffcc"
| 5
| May 3
| @ Boston
| W 90–85
| Jermaine O'Neal (19)
| Jermaine O'Neal (10)
| Jamaal Tinsley (7)
| FleetCenter18,624
| 3–2
|- align="center" bgcolor="#ffcccc"
| 6
| May 5
| Boston
| L 89–92 (OT)
| Jermaine O'Neal (26)
| Dale Davis (14)
| Anthony Johnson (4)
| Conseco Fieldhouse18,345
| 3–3
|- align="center" bgcolor="#ccffcc"
| 7
| May 7
| @ Boston
| W 97–70
| Stephen Jackson (24)
| Jeff Foster (12)
| Jermaine O'Neal (6)
| FleetCenter18,624
| 4–3
|-

|- align="center" bgcolor="#ffcccc"
| 1
| May 9
| @ Detroit
| L 81–96
| Jermaine O'Neal (22)
| Jeff Foster (13)
| Johnson, Miller (3)
| The Palace of Auburn Hills22,076
| 0–1
|- align="center" bgcolor="#ccffcc"
| 2
| May 11
| @ Detroit
| W 92–83
| Jermaine O'Neal (22)
| Jeff Foster (20)
| Jamaal Tinsley (12)
| The Palace of Auburn Hills22,076
| 1–1
|- align="center" bgcolor="#ccffcc"
| 3
| May 13
| Detroit
| W 79–74
| Reggie Miller (17)
| Jeff Foster (12)
| Jamaal Tinsley (6)
| Conseco Fieldhouse18,345
| 2–1
|- align="center" bgcolor="#ffcccc"
| 4
| May 15
| Detroit
| L 76–89
| Stephen Jackson (23)
| Jermaine O'Neal (13)
| Anthony Johnson (6)
| Conseco Fieldhouse18,345
| 2–2
|- align="center" bgcolor="#ffcccc"
| 5
| May 17
| @ Detroit
| L 67–86
| Jermaine O'Neal (14)
| Dale Davis (12)
| Jamaal Tinsley (5)
| The Palace of Auburn Hills22,076
| 2–3
|- align="center" bgcolor="#ffcccc"
| 6
| May 19
| Detroit
| L 79–88
| Reggie Miller (27)
| Jermaine O'Neal (11)
| Jamaal Tinsley (10)
| Conseco Fieldhouse18,345
| 2–4
|-

Player statistics

Season

Playoffs

Player Statistics Citation:

Awards and records
 Jermaine O'Neal, NBA All-Star Game

Additions
{| cellspacing="0"
| valign="top" |

Subtractions

 An NBA team is normally not allowed to carry more than 12 active players and three inactive players on its roster at any time during the season, but the Pacers were granted an exception to this rule by the NBA due to the Pacers' unusually high number of injured and suspended players.

References

Indiana Pacers seasons
Pace
Pace
Indiana